Etruscan Press is a literary press assocaited with Wilkes University (Wilkes-Barre, Pennsylvania) in partnership with Youngstown State University (Youngstown, Ohio). The press, which was founded in 2001 by Philip Brady and Robert Mooney, specializes in publishing poetry, fiction, and creative nonfiction. The press is a member of the Community of Literary Magazines and Presses (CLMP).

Genres
Etruscan Press publishes books of poems, novels, short stories, creative non-fiction, criticism, translation, and anthologies. Etruscan was one of five finalists for the 2015 AWP Small Press Publisher Award. Three works from Etruscan's collection of poetry were named finalists for the National Book Award and another was named to the Longlist (the NBA's “Top Ten” in poetry). Other titles are recipients of the Poetry Society of America's “First Book Award,” the Foreword Reviews Book of the Year Award, and PEN Oakland's “Josephine Miles Award.” Three poems published by Etruscan were selected for Best American Poetry. Most recently, titles published by Etruscan Press were awarded the Theodore Roethke Memorial Poetry Prize, Mass Book Award, nominated for the Hurston/Wright Legacy Award in Poetry, named finalists for the Foreword Reviews Book of the Year Award, Housatonic Book Award, Helen Smith Memorial Prize for Best Book of Poetry, and longlisted for the PEN/Diamonstein-Spielvogel Award for the Art of the Essay.

Published books
Black Metamorphoses by Shanta Lee Gander (2023)
Mailer's Last Days by J. Michael Lennon (2022)
Generations by Dante Di Stefano, William Heyen, and H. L. Hix (2022)
Reading the Signs: and other itinerant essays by Stephen Benz (2022)
Voodoo Libretto: New and Selected Poems by Tim Seibles (2022)
Also Dark by Angelique Palmer (2021)
Trio by Karen Donovan, Diane Raptosh, and Daneen Wardrop (2021)
Wait for God to Notice by Sari Fordham (2021)
Bestiality of the Involved by Spring Ulmer (2021)
Scar by Bruce Bond (2020)
The Last Orgasm by Nin Andrews (2020)
Variations in the Key of K by Alex Stein (2020)
Dear Z: The Zygote Epistles by Diane Raptosh (2020)
Triptych by Peter Grandbois, James McCorkle, and Robert Miltner (2020)
50 Miles by Sheryl St. Germain (2020)
Clay and Star: Selected Poems of Liliana Ursu translated by Mihaela Moscaliuc (2019)
Demonstrategy: Poetry, For and Against by H. L. Hix (2019)
Topographies by Stephen Benz (2019)
Ill Angels by Dante Di Stefano (2019)
Museum of Stones by Lynn Lurie (2019)
Sixteen by Auguste Corteau (2019)
Wattle & daub by Brian Coughlan (2018)
Silk Road by Daneen Wardrop (2018)
Romer by Robert Eastwood (2018)
Rough Ground by Alix Anne Shaw (2018)
Aard-vark to Axolotl: Pictures From My Grandfather's Dictionary by Karen Donovan (2018)
In the Cemetery of the Orange Trees by Jeff Talarigo (2018)
Areas of Fog by Will Dowd (2017)
Mr. Either/Or by Aaron Poochigian (2017)
All the Difference by Patricia Horvath (2017)
Rain Inscription by H. L. Hix (2017)
Luz Bones by Myrna Stone (2017)
One Turn Around the Sun by Tim Seibles (2017)
The Candle: Poems of Our 20th Century Holocausts by William Heyen (2016)
Human Directional by Diane Raptosh (2016)
A Heaven Wrought of Iron: Poems From the Odyssey by D. M. Spitzer (2016)
The Dog Looks Happy Upside Down by Meg Pokrass (2016)
Who's Afraid of Helen of Troy: An Essay on Love by David Lazar (2016)
American Anger: An Evidentiary by H. L. Hix (2016) 
Crave: Sojourn of a Hungry Soul by Laurie Jean Cannady (2015) 
Arcadia Road: A Trilogy by Thorpe Moeckel (2015) 
YOU. by Joseph P. Wood (2015)
Cannot Stay: Essays on Travel by Kevin Oderman (2015)
The Other Sky by Bruce Bond and Aron Wiesenfeld (2015) 
Poems and Their Making: A Conversation edited by Philip Brady (2015)
I'm Here to Learn to Dream In Your Language by H. L. Hix (2015) 
Surrendering Oz: A Life in Essays by Bonnie Friedman (2014) 
Quick Kills by Lynn Lurie (2014)
The Greatest Jewish-American Lover In Hungarian History by Michael Blumenthal (2014)
The Arsonist's Song Has Nothing to Do With Fire by Allison Titus (2014) 
The Subtle Bodies by James McCorkle (2014) 
As Much As, If Not More Than by H. L. Hix (2014)
An Archaeology of Yearning by Bruce Mills (2013) 
Scything Grace by Sean Thomas Dougherty (2013)
American Amnesiac by Diane Raptosh (2013) 
Help Wanted Female by Sara Pritchard (2013)
Choir Of The Wells by Bruce Bond (2013)
What We Ask Of Flesh by Remica L. Bingham (2013)
White Vespa by Kevin Oderman (2012)
No Hurry by Michael Blumenthal (2012)
The Football Corporations by William Heyen (2012)
Zarathustra Must Die by Dorian Alexander (2012)
Body Of A Dancer by Renée E. D’Aoust (2011) 
Fast Animal by Tim Seibles (2012)
Lines of Inquiry by H. L. Hix (2011)
Nahoonkara by Peter Grandbois (2011)
The Gambler's Nephew by Jack Matthews (2011)
The Burning House by Paul Lisicky (2011)
Coronology by Claire Bateman (2010) 
First Fire, Then Birds by H. L. Hix (2010)
The Casanova Chronicles by Myrna Stone (2010)
So Late, So Soon by Carol Moldaw (2010)
Venison by Thorpe Moeckel (2010)
The Fugitive Self by John Wheatcroft (2009)
Incident Light by H. L. Hix (2009) 
Peal by Bruce Bond (2009)
Synergos by Roberto Manzano/Steven Reese (2009)
The Disappearance of Seth by Kazim Ali (2009)
Toucans in the Arctic by Scott Coffel (2009)
Lies Will Take You Somewhere by Sheila Schwartz (2009)
A Poetics of Hiroshima by William Heyen (2008)
Legible Heavens by H. L. Hix (2008)
Saint Joe's Passion by J.D. Schraffenberger (2008) 
Drift Ice by Jennifer Atkinson (2008)
American Fugue by Alexis Stamatis (2008)
The Widening by Carol Moldaw (2008) 
God Bless: A Political/Poetic Discourse by H. L. Hix (2007)
Parallel Lives by Michael Lind (2007)
Chromatic by H. L. Hix (2006)
The Confessions of Doc Williams & Other Poems by William Heyen (2006) 
Art Into Life: The Craft of Literary Biography by Frederick Karl (2005)
Shadows of Houses by H. L. Hix (2005)
The White Horse: A Columbian Journey by Diane Thiel (2004)
Wild and Whirling Words: A Poetic Conversation by H. L. Hix  (2004) 
Crow Man by Tom Bailey (2003)
Shoah Train by William Heyen (2003)
Cinder by Bruce Bond (2003)
Free Concert: New and Selected Poems by Milton Kessler (2002)
As Easy As Lying: Essays on Poetry by H. L. Hix (2002)
September 11, 2001: American Writers Respond by William Heyen (2002)

References

Publishing companies established in 2001
Book publishing companies based in Pennsylvania